S Boötis is a Mira variable in the constellation Boötes. It ranges between magnitudes 7.8 and 13.8 over a period of approximately 270 days.

References

Boötes
Mira variables
126289
M-type giants
070291
Boötis, S
Durchmusterung objects